The canton of Lurcy-Lévis is a former administrative division in central France. It was disbanded following the French canton reorganisation which came into effect in March 2015. It consisted of 9 communes, which joined the canton of Bourbon-l'Archambault in 2015. It had 4,651 inhabitants (2012).

The canton comprised the following communes:

Château-sur-Allier
Couleuvre
Couzon
Limoise
Lurcy-Lévis
Neure
Pouzy-Mésangy
Saint-Léopardin-d'Augy
Le Veurdre

Demographics

See also
Cantons of the Allier department

References

Former cantons of Allier
2015 disestablishments in France
States and territories disestablished in 2015